Julienne van Loon (born 1970) is an Australian author and academic.

In 2004 van Loon won The Australian/Vogel Literary Award for her first book, Road Story.

Van Loon lived in Perth, where she was a senior lecturer in the Department of Communication and Cultural Studies at Curtin University from 1997 to 2015. In September 2015 she was appointed Vice Chancellor's Principal Research Fellow at RMIT University. She was director of the Australian Society of Authors from 2015 to 2017.

Her first non-fiction book The Thinking Woman, was developed from conversations she had with seven feminist thinkers (Laura Kipnis, Siri Hustvedt, Nancy Holmstrom, Helen Caldicott, Julia Kristeva, Marina Warner and Rosi Braidotti) and covers six themes (love, work, play, fear, wonder and friendship).

Works

Novels
Road Story (2005, Allen & Unwin)
Beneath the Bloodwood Tree (2008, Allen & Unwin)
Harmless (2013, Fremantle Press)

Non-fiction
The Thinking Woman (2019, NewSouth Publishing)

References

External links 
 

1970 births
Living people
Writers from Perth, Western Australia
University of Wollongong alumni
Academic staff of RMIT University